Irénée Bergé (February 1, 1867 – July 30, 1926) was a French composer, conductor and instructor who lived in the United States.  In spite of confusions between his given name and Irène, Bergé was male.

Early life and career
According to one source he was born in Toulouse although other sources say Paris. He attended the Conservatoire de Paris where he studied with Jules Massenet and Théodore Dubois. While under Massenet's tutelage, he and other of the composers' students purchased a gift for the opera singer Sibyl Sanderson, who rewarded them by making a personal visit and sang an excerpt from the opera Esclarmonde with the composer at the piano.  "The students were spellbound...never had they enjoyed their professor's opera so much, and never had they heard such artistic singing." Although not mentioned in his obituaries, Berge apparently also was a tenor.  In an 1897 performance of Berlioz's L'enfance du Christ, a reviewer noted "Irénée Bergé, a young tenor of excellent schooling, whose voice—though not too powerful—had a very agreeable timbre, and a very distinguished [performance]. He and that of the orchestra....had a grand success."

Before immigrating to the United States he was an assistant conductor at Covent Garden. At the invitation of Jeannette Thurber Bergé came to New York in 1902 to teach at the National Conservatory of Music of America.

Work in the United States
He wrote two operas, Corsica and Nicolette (one source includes an opera titled The Knave of Hearts). Corsica was written to a libretto by Frederick F. Schrader. It had its premiere in the week prior to November 13, 1910 on a bill with Joseph Carl Breil's opera Love Laughs at Locksmiths (also with a libretto by Schrader) in Kingston, New York, as part of Breil's touring opera company. A 1915 announcement indicated that Corsica "has been just acquired for London and was scheduled for production in the spring."

In 1915 he wrote the song "Blue Bonnet" (with lyricist George Sloan Bryan) and entered it in a contest for the Texas state song.

Bergé is known for composing many silent film music cues.  These were not written for a specific film but as generic pieces appropriate to the mood of the specific scene.

He had been living at 35 Van Wagenen Avenue, Jersey City, New Jersey, when he died on July 30, 1926.  He was survived by his wife Jeanne.

Partial list of works

Vocal
Les Nymphes d'Artémis
Le gente meunière (L. Gregh) (for tenor and bass)
Le joyeux pêcheur (L. Gregh) (for tenor and bass)
Berceuse bretonne (Leduc)
Chanson de mousse (Baudoux)
Chanson de vendanges (Fromont)
Chansons des champs (Baudou) (8 songs)
Le chanson du chevalier (Ondet)

Operas 
Corsica (1910)
Nicolette

Chamber
Nocturne (string quartet, harp and flute)

Piano 
Capriccio (Badoux)
Chant d'Amour (Bryant)
Le Cyprin, étude fantaisie (Baudoux)
Danse hongroise 
Dormez ma mie
Ecoutez chanter les Pinsons (Weiller)
En Mai, valse de salon
Eté
Les fleurs et l'aimée
Gavotte in G major 
Gerbe des roses, mazurka (Weiller)
Impressions d'été
Impromptu-valse
La machine à coudre, morceau caractérisique (Fromont)
Mazurka de concert (Leduc)
Minuet in A Major
Mes baisers sont des papillons
La mouche, fantaisie
La nuit descent des cieux
Le papillon, méditation
Plaintive Chanson (Bryant)
La Promenade de la Merveilleuse - The Coquette (Bryant)
Rêve d'amour
Réveil
Sérénade espagnole
Six dances anciennes
Sonnet
Valse de l'abeille (Ricordi)
Vous, souvenez-vous (Fromont)

Film music 
Affection
Agitated hurry
Agitated hurry no. 2
Agitato: anxious expectation 
Andante cantabile
Andante pathetique
Appassionato dramático
Astir
Chant erotique 
Comic misterioso 
Continuous motion
Dramatic andante
Dramatic lamento
Dramatic reproach
Furioso
Hurry
Misterioso
Oriental
Storm scene
Tragic scene

Notes

External links 

1867 births
1926 deaths
French male classical composers
French film score composers
French male film score composers
French opera composers
Male opera composers
Conservatoire de Paris alumni
20th-century classical composers
Musicians from Paris
French male conductors (music)
20th-century French composers
20th-century French conductors (music)
20th-century French male musicians